Giovanni Participazio may refer to:

 Giovanni I Participazio (died 837), tenth (historical) or twelfth (traditional) Doge of Venice
 Giovanni II Participazio (died 887), thirteenth (historical) or fifteenth (traditional) Doge of Venice